The Natuna Island surili (Presbytis natunae) is a species of primate in the family Cercopithecidae.

Details 
The species is endemic to the Indonesian island of Natuna Besar. It was separated from P. siamensis by Groves in 2001.

A study published in 2003 estimates the population to be less than 10,000 as of 2002, the main threat being heavy logging since 1980.

References

Natuna Island surili
Primates of Indonesia
Endemic fauna of Indonesia
Vulnerable fauna of Asia
Natuna Island surili
Taxa named by Oldfield Thomas
Taxa named by Ernst Hartert